Frances Wright was a writer and reformer.

Frances Wright may also refer to:

 Frances Claudia Wright (1919–2010), Sierra Leonean lawyer
Frances Kazan, née Frances Wright
Frannie Wright on Holiday Ranch
Frances Wright, political candidate for Calgary Centre
Frances Woodworth Wright (1897–1989), American astronomer

See also
Frank Wright (disambiguation)